An hórreo is a typical granary from the northwest of the Iberian Peninsula (Asturias, Galicia, where it might be called a Galician granary, and Northern Portugal), built in wood or stone, raised from the ground (to keep rodents out) by pillars ( in Asturian, pegoyos in Cantabrian,  in Galician,  in Portuguese,  in Basque) ending in flat staddle stones (vira-ratos in Galician, mueles or tornarratos in Asturian, or zubiluzea in Basque) to prevent access by rodents. Ventilation is allowed by the slits in its walls.

Names 
In some areas, hórreos are known as horriu,  (Asturian),  (Leonese),  (Cantabrian), hórreo, paneira, canastro, piorno, cabazo (Galician),  (Portuguese),  (Basque).

Distribution 

Hórreos are mainly found in the Northwest of Spain (Galicia and Asturias) and Northern Portugal. There are two main types of hórreo, rectangular-shaped, the more extended, usually found in Galicia and coastal areas of Asturias; and square-shaped hórreos from Asturias, León, western Cantabria and eastern Galicia.

Origins 
The oldest document containing an image of an hórreo is the Cantigas de Santa Maria by Alfonso X "El Sabio" (song CLXXXVII) from the 13th century. In this depiction, three rectangular hórreos of gothic style are illustrated.

Types 
There are several types of Asturian hórreo, according to the characteristics of the roof (thatched, tiled, slate, pitched or double pitched), the materials used for the pillars or the decoration. The oldest still standing date from the 15th century, and even nowadays they are built ex novo. There are an estimated 18,000 hórreos and paneras in Asturias, some are poorly preserved but there is a growing awareness from owners and authorities to maintain them in good shape.

The longest hórreo in Galicia is located in Carnota, A Coruña, and is 35 m long.

Hórreo-like granaries in Europe 
Similar granaries were common throughout Atlantic Europe: Northwest Iberian Peninsula, France, the British Isles, Scandinavia.

There are espigueiros or canastros in northern Portugal (the most famous concentration is located in Soajo).

French Savoy has its regard, also encountered in the Swiss Valais (raccard) and the Italian Aosta Valley (rascard). Hambars are found in the Balkans, and serender in northern Turkey.

Similar buildings (barns) on staddle stones are found in Southern England.

See also
 Raccard
 Hambar
 Horreum
 Corn crib

References

External links

Hórreo de Carnota
Asturian Hórreo
Galician hórreos
Horreos in English
 :es:Archivo:Santa fe navarra horreo jpg
Nice collection of images of horreos.
Large collection of images of staddle stones/pillars

Buildings and structures in Asturias
Buildings and structures in Galicia (Spain)
Buildings and structures in Cantabria
Architecture in Spain
Granaries
Food storage